Orešje is a settlement (naselje) in the Sveta Nedelja administrative territory of Zagreb County, Croatia. As of 2011, it had a population of 1,043 persons.

References

Populated places in Zagreb County